Moran Fridman (born 3 January 1990) is an Israeli football player who plays as a midfielder for ASA Tel Aviv University.

Honours 
ASA Tel Aviv University
Winner
 Ligat Nashim (5): 2010–11, 2011–12, 2012–13, 2013–14, 2014–15
 Israeli Women's Cup (3): 2010–11, 2011–12, 2013–14

External links 

 (1st page)
 (2nd page)

1990 births
Living people
Israeli Jews
Israeli women's footballers
Israel women's international footballers
Hakoah Amidar Ramat Gan F.C. (women) players
ASA Tel Aviv University players
Women's association football midfielders
Footballers from Central District (Israel)